The Simpang Ampat railway station is a railway station located at  Simpang Ampat, Penang, Malaysia.

References

KTM ETS railway stations
Railway stations in Penang
South Seberang Perai District